Zalzala may refer to:

 Az-Zalzala, the 99th sura of the Qur'an
 Zalzala (1988 film), a 1988 Bollywood film
 Operation Zalzala, a 2008 Pakistan Army military offensive manhunt
 Zalzala Jazeera, a Pakistani island formed in 2013 by an earthquake